The D.H. Anderson House is a historic house located at 315 East Locust in Maquoketa, Iowa.

Description and history 
This is one of several houses in town that are noteworthy for their quoined corners, a rare architectural feature in Iowa. The 2½-story brick house features an irregular roofline with both hipped and
gabled areas, two large chimneys with corbelled chimney pots, and a wrap-around porch. It was built for D. H. Anderson in 1888 in a section of the city known as "Society Hill." These were financial boom years for Maquoketa. Anderson settled here with his parents in 1854, and grew to become a successful businessman. He married Mary L. Goodenow, the daughter of John L. Goodenow, who was known as the "Father of Maquoketa."

The house was listed on the National Register of Historic Places on August 9, 1991.  The D.H. Anderson Building in downtown is also associated with him.

References

Houses completed in 1888
Victorian architecture in Iowa
Houses in Maquoketa, Iowa
National Register of Historic Places in Jackson County, Iowa
Houses on the National Register of Historic Places in Iowa